Kovylny is a rural locality (a khutor) in Kommunarovskoye Rural Settlement, Leninsky District, Volgograd Oblast, Russia. The population was 75 as of 2010. There are 4 streets.

Geography 
Kovylny is located in steppe, 21 km northeast of Leninsk (the district's administrative centre) by road. Kommunar is the nearest rural locality.

References 

Rural localities in Leninsky District, Volgograd Oblast